"Cable router" has two basic meanings:

 Single Cable Router (SCR) - a down-conversion device for the radio data link. It converts RF signal from a satellite dish or TV antenna to the user-defined IF channel. Usually, many SCRs are connected to a single coaxial cable - each converting to a separate IF channel. The entire system referred to as Single Cable Distribution.
 A piece of computer network equipment located between cable modem and LAN, performing functions of the network router in a modem.

Cable routers are usually integrated with the modem, frequently incorporating  firewall, proxy, or network gateway functions as well.

See also

Cable/DSL router

Networking hardware